Salt Brook is a tributary of the Passaic River in Union County, New Jersey in the United States.

Salt Brook starts in Summit, New Jersey in the highlands south and west of Memorial Field.  It then flows north and then west through Summit.  It then flows through New Providence, New Jersey where it joins the Passaic River.  Flooding is occasionally a problem along the Salt Brook, especially in the Memorial Field area and parts of New Providence. Local tradition is that the brook got its name when the locals dumped  their salt into the brook to keep it out of the hands of advancing British soldiers during the American Revolutionary War.

The brook is only about 5 miles in length and is about 15 feet across in most locations.  The western part of Summit and most of New Providence drain into the Passaic River via the Salt Brook.

There is an elementary school in New Providence located just north of the brook that is named after the brook, called Salt Brook Elementary School.

See also
List of rivers of New Jersey

Rivers of Union County, New Jersey
Rivers of New Jersey